The Treaty of Berwick (also known as the Peace of Berwick or the Pacification of Berwick) was signed on 19 June 1639 between England and Scotland. It ended minor hostilities the day before. Archibald Johnston was involved in the negotiations before King Charles was forced to sign the treaty. The agreement, overall, officially ended the First Bishops' War even though both sides saw it only as a temporary truce. After the treaty was signed, King Charles immediately began to gather the resources he needed in order to strengthen his armies. At the beginning of the Second Bishops' War, the agreement was broken. After a disastrous skirmish at Kelso between the English advance guard and the Scottish Covenanter Army, the Earl of Holland fled back to the king's headquarters at Berwick-upon-Tweed. The Earl of Antrim failed to establish negotiations in order to bring the Irish army over. This, along with the unsuccessful English naval campaign at Hamilton, meant that Charles was forced to sign a truce. He conceded to the Scots the right to a free church assembly and a free parliament.

References

See also
Bishops' Wars
List of treaties

1639 in England
1639 in Scotland
History of Northumberland
Berwick (1639)
Berwick (1639)
Wars of the Three Kingdoms
Berwick
England–Scotland relations